Viburnum mortonianum is a species of plant in the Adoxaceae family.  It is found in El Salvador and Guatemala.

References

mortonianum
Data deficient plants
Taxonomy articles created by Polbot